High Life  is the second album by Frankie Miller. It was produced by Allen Toussaint, who also composed seven songs on the album. "Play Something Sweet (Brickyard Blues)" was released by Three Dog Night the same year as Miller's, and "Shoo Rah" was covered by Betty Wright—and both of these cover versions become chart hits.

Despite poor sales, the album was critically well received, although Miller was to disown it as Chrysalis Records issued the record in remixed form, without Miller's or Toussaint's knowledge or consent. The remix, by Don Davis and Lou Costello, remains the most widely available version of High Life; Toussaint and Miller's original mix of the album was made available on the 2011 Frankie Miller box set That's Who.

Track listing
All tracks composed by Allen Toussaint, except where indicated:

Side One
"High Life"
"Play Something Sweet (Brickyard Blues)"
"Trouble" (Frankie Miller)
"A Fool"
"Little Angel" (Frankie Miller)
"With You in Mind"

Side Two
"The Devil Gun" (Frankie Miller)
"I'll Take a Melody"
"Just a Song"
"Shoo Rah" 
"I'm Falling in Love Again" (Frankie Miller)

Personnel
Frankie Miller - vocals, acoustic guitar

Rhythm
Allen Toussaint - piano, organ, conga
 Joe Wilson - guitar, slide guitar
 Tom Robb - bass, conga
 Mike Huey - drums
 G. C. Coleman - drums
 Auburn Burrell - dobra guitar
 Barry Bailey - guitar

Horns
 Lester Caliste - trombone
 Clyde Kerr Jr - trumpet
 Gary Brown - tenor saxophone
 John Longo - trumpet
 Alvin Thomas - baritone saxophone

Production
Recorded at Web IV Recording Studio, Atlanta, Georgia
Engineered by Joe Wilson
Horns recorded at Studio in the Country, Bogalusa, Louisiana
Remix by Don Davis, Lou Costello at United Sound Studios, Detroit
Arranged and Produced by Allen Toussaint

References

1974 albums
Frankie Miller albums
Chrysalis Records albums
Albums produced by Allen Toussaint
Albums recorded at Studio in the Country